Love Me Tonight is a 1932 movie musical by Rodgers and Hart, as well as its title song and hit for Jeanette MacDonald.

Love Me Tonight may also refer to:
"Love Me Tonight" (Tom Jones song), 1969
"Love Me Tonight" (Angelica Agurbash song), 2005 Belarus Eurovision entry
"Love Me Tonight", 1932 song by Bing Crosby with music by Victor Young, covered by Mildred Bailey, Annette Henshaw and Art Jarrett
"Love Me Tonight", song by Trini Lopez
"Love Me Tonight", song by Shaking Stevens from The Bop Won't Stop
"Love Me Tonight", hit song by Head East